Jack O'Keefe (29 September 1915 – 8 March 2000) was an Australian rules footballer who played with Melbourne, Hawthorn and South Melbourne in the Victorian Football League (VFL). O'Keefe was a reserve in Melbourne's 1939 Grand Final win in his first season. He was a premiership player again in his next two seasons before moving to Hawthorn in 1943. After 33 games with the Hawks he finished his career with a season at South Melbourne.

References

External links

1915 births
2000 deaths
Australian rules footballers from Victoria (Australia)
Melbourne Football Club players
Hawthorn Football Club players
Sydney Swans players
Northcote Football Club players
Melbourne Football Club Premiership players
Three-time VFL/AFL Premiership players